StarPower is an educational game for 12 to 35 players, designed by R. Garry Shirts for Simulation Training Systems in 1969.

The game combines chance and skill at trading to establish a score.  Players are assigned categories based upon their relative scores, with the highest scoring category being able to change the rules.  The game is designed to illustrate the behavior of human beings in a system that naturally stratifies them economically or politically.

Play 
Players randomly draw lots of colored chips.  These chips have different number value based on their color. Players are given the opportunity to trade these chips to increase their point total. Players are told to not share information
about their chips.  While players
are told that the group assignment is based on "achievement"
or "merit", the initial
distribution dominates the resulting scores.

Each round, players draw random colored chips and trade them for
sets of points.  At the end of each round players are assigned
one of three groups and given an associated badge based on their
score.  The top scorers are red squares, the middle are blue
circles, and the low scorers are green triangles.  Starting on
turn two (the first turn in which players are assigned to
groups), the red squares players draw from a bag with higher
scoring chips, while the green triangles draw from a bag with
lower scoring chips.  As a result, movement between groups
becomes uncommon.  Starting on the third round, the red
squares are free to change the rules however they
like.

Key to the game's educational effectiveness is for those running the game to withhold details about the true nature and implementation.  That the red squares can change the rules is only revealed to players when the ability is added to the game.

Starpower is by design a very unbalanced game. Game designer James Wallis has gone so far as to describe the game as "broken" "by all conventional standards of game design."  The unbalanced nature of the game reduces its replayability.   Shirts views StarPower as more of a simulation than a game and as a result does not view replayability as an important goal.

Typical results 
One commentator writing for the Sustainability Institute claimed that square players typically rigged the game to benefit squares, circles strove to become squares at which point they began to act like squares, and that triangles became angry and then apathetic, only becoming interested at the possibility of cheating or revolution.  At the end of the game, the squares seldom see the oppression they engaged in while the circles are viewed as sell-outs by the triangles and as incompetent by the squares.

Another commentator notes similar results.  The squares create oppressive rules that make it difficult for lower groups to advance. Lower groups turn to cheating. The commentator also noted the lower groups becoming apathetic.

The official site for the game lists eight lessons that StarPower teaches, mostly focused on the results of inequal distribution of power.

See also
BaFa' BaFa' - cross cultural competence game by R. Garry Shirts

References

References 
 

External links 
 StarPower - official site

Board games introduced in 1969
Educational board games